In cryptography, a zero-knowledge proof or zero-knowledge protocol is a method by which one party (the prover) can prove to another party (the verifier) that a given statement is true while the prover avoids conveying any additional information apart from the fact that the statement is indeed true. The essence of zero-knowledge proofs is that it is trivial to prove that one possesses knowledge of certain information by simply revealing it; the challenge is to prove such possession without revealing the information itself or any additional information.

If proving a statement requires that the prover possess some secret information, then the verifier will not be able to prove the statement to anyone else without possessing the secret information. The statement being proved must include the assertion that the prover has such knowledge, but without including or transmitting the knowledge itself in the assertion. Otherwise, the statement would not be proved in zero-knowledge because it provides the verifier with additional information about the statement by the end of the protocol. A zero-knowledge proof of knowledge is a special case when the statement consists only of the fact that the prover possesses the secret information.

Interactive zero-knowledge proofs require interaction between the individual (or computer system) proving their knowledge and the individual validating the proof. Non-interactive zero-knowledge proofs can be constructed from any interactive scheme by relying on the Fiat-Shamir heuristic, which is the most common instantiation of such proofs today. However, the validity of the proof relies on computational assumptions (typically the assumptions of an ideal cryptographic hash function).

A protocol implementing zero-knowledge proofs of knowledge is often presented as a transcript where a prover responds to interactive inputs from the verifier. This interactive input is usually in the form of one or more challenges such that the responses from the prover will convince the verifier if and only if the statement is true, i.e., if the prover does possess the claimed knowledge. If this were not the case, the verifier could record the execution of the protocol and replay it to convince someone else that they possess the secret information. The new party's acceptance is either justified since the replayer does possess the information (which implies that the protocol leaked information, and thus, is not proved in zero-knowledge), or the acceptance is spurious, i.e., was accepted from someone who does not actually possess the information.

Abstract examples

The Ali Baba cave 

There is a well-known story presenting the fundamental ideas of zero-knowledge proofs, first published in 1990 by Jean-Jacques Quisquater and others in their paper "How to Explain Zero-Knowledge Protocols to Your Children". It is common practice to label the two parties in a zero-knowledge proof as Peggy (the prover of the statement) and Victor (the verifier of the statement).

In this story, Peggy has uncovered the secret word used to open a magic door in a cave. The cave is shaped like a ring, with the entrance on one side and the magic door blocking the opposite side. Victor wants to know whether Peggy knows the secret word; but Peggy, being a very private person, does not want to reveal her knowledge (the secret word) to Victor or to reveal the fact of her knowledge to the world in general.

They label the left and right paths from the entrance A and B. First, Victor waits outside the cave as Peggy goes in. Peggy takes either path A or B; Victor is not allowed to see which path she takes. Then, Victor enters the cave and shouts the name of the path he wants her to use to return, either A or B, chosen at random. Providing she really does know the magic word, this is easy: she opens the door, if necessary, and returns along the desired path.

However, suppose she did not know the word. Then, she would only be able to return by the named path if Victor were to give the name of the same path by which she had entered. Since Victor would choose A or B at random, she would have a 50% chance of guessing correctly. If they were to repeat this trick many times, say 20 times in a row, her chance of successfully anticipating all of Victor's requests would become very small (1 in 220, or very roughly 1 in a million).

Thus, if Peggy repeatedly appears at the exit Victor names, he can conclude that it is extremely probable that Peggy does, in fact, know the secret word.

One side note with respect to third-party observers: even if Victor is wearing a hidden camera that records the whole transaction, the only thing the camera will record is in one case Victor shouting "A!" and Peggy appearing at A or in the other case Victor shouting "B!" and Peggy appearing at B. A recording of this type would be trivial for any two people to fake (requiring only that Peggy and Victor agree beforehand on the sequence of A's and B's that Victor will shout). Such a recording will certainly never be convincing to anyone but the original participants. In fact, even a person who was present as an observer at the original experiment would be unconvinced, since Victor and Peggy might have orchestrated the whole "experiment" from start to finish.

Further notice that if Victor chooses his A's and B's by flipping a coin on-camera, this protocol loses its zero-knowledge property; the on-camera coin flip would probably be convincing to any person watching the recording later. Thus, although this does not reveal the secret word to Victor, it does make it possible for Victor to convince the world in general that Peggy has that knowledge—counter to Peggy's stated wishes. However, digital cryptography generally "flips coins" by relying on a pseudo-random number generator, which is akin to a coin with a fixed pattern of heads and tails known only to the coin's owner. If Victor's coin behaved this way, then again it would be possible for Victor and Peggy to have faked the "experiment", so using a pseudo-random number generator would not reveal Peggy's knowledge to the world in the same way that using a flipped coin would.

Notice that Peggy could prove to Victor that she knows the magic word, without revealing it to him, in a single trial. If both Victor and Peggy go together to the mouth of the cave, Victor can watch Peggy go in through A and come out through B. This would prove with certainty that Peggy knows the magic word, without revealing the magic word to Victor. However, such a proof could be observed by a third party, or recorded by Victor and such a proof would be convincing to anybody. In other words, Peggy could not refute such proof by claiming she colluded with Victor, and she is therefore no longer in control of who is aware of her knowledge.

Two balls and the colour-blind friend 

Imagine your friend "Victor" is red-green colour-blind (while you are not) and you have two balls: one red and one green, but otherwise identical. To Victor, the balls seem completely identical.  Victor is skeptical that the balls are actually distinguishable. You want to prove to Victor that the balls are in fact differently-coloured, but nothing else.  In particular, you do not want to reveal which ball is the red one and which is the green.

Here is the proof system. You give the two balls to Victor and he puts them behind his back. Next, he takes one of the balls and brings it out from behind his back and displays it. He then places it behind his back again and then chooses to reveal just one of the two balls, picking one of the two at random with equal probability. He will ask you, "Did I switch the ball?" This whole procedure is then repeated as often as necessary.

By looking at the balls' colours, you can, of course, say with certainty whether or not he switched them. On the other hand, if the balls were the same colour and hence indistinguishable, there is no way you could guess correctly with probability higher than 50%.

Since the probability that you would have randomly succeeded at identifying each switch/non-switch is 50%, the probability of having randomly succeeded at all switch/non-switches approaches zero ("soundness"). If you and your friend repeat this "proof" multiple times (e.g. 20 times), your friend should become convinced ("completeness") that the balls are indeed differently coloured.

The above proof is zero-knowledge because your friend never learns which ball is green and which is red; indeed, he gains no knowledge about how to distinguish the balls.

Definition 

A zero-knowledge proof of some statement must satisfy three properties:

 Completeness: if the statement is true, an honest verifier (that is, one following the protocol properly) will be convinced of this fact by an honest prover.
 Soundness: if the statement is false, no cheating prover can convince an honest verifier that it is true, except with some small probability.
 Zero-knowledge: if the statement is true, no verifier learns anything other than the fact that the statement is true. In other words, just knowing the statement (not the secret) is sufficient to imagine a scenario showing that the prover knows the secret. This is formalized by showing that every verifier has some simulator that, given only the statement to be proved (and no access to the prover), can produce a transcript that "looks like" an interaction between an honest prover and the verifier in question.

The first two of these are properties of more general interactive proof systems. The third is what makes the proof zero-knowledge.

Zero-knowledge proofs are not proofs in the mathematical sense of the term because there is some small probability, the soundness error, that a cheating prover will be able to convince the verifier of a false statement.  In other words, zero-knowledge proofs are probabilistic "proofs" rather than deterministic proofs.  However, there are techniques to decrease the soundness error to negligibly small values. 

A formal definition of zero-knowledge has to use some computational model, the most common one being that of a Turing machine.

 

The prover  is modeled as having unlimited computation power (in practice,  usually is a probabilistic Turing machine). The auxiliary string  in the definition plays the role of "prior knowledge" (including the random coins of ).

The definition given is that of perfect zero-knowledge. Computational zero-knowledge is obtained by requiring that the views of the verifier  and the simulator are only computationally indistinguishable, given the auxiliary string.

Practical examples

Discrete log of a given value 

We can apply these ideas to a more realistic cryptography application. Peggy wants to prove to Victor that she knows the discrete log of a given value in a given group.

For example, given a value , a large prime  and a generator , she wants to prove that she knows a value  such that , without revealing .

The protocol proceeds as follows: in each round, Peggy generates a random number , computes  and discloses this to Victor. With either answer, Peggy is only disclosing a random value, so no information is disclosed by a correct execution of one round of the protocol.

Victor can verify either answer; if he requested , he can then compute  and verify that it matches . If he requested , he can verify that  is consistent with this, by computing  and verifying that it matches .

If Peggy knew or could guess which challenge Victor is going to issue, then she could easily cheat and convince Victor that she knows  when she does not: if she knows that Victor is going to request , then she proceeds normally: she picks , computes  and discloses  to Victor; she will be able to respond to Victor's challenge. On the other hand, if she knows that Victor will request , then she picks a random value , computes , and discloses  to Victor as the value of  that he is expecting.

However, if in either one of the above scenarios Victor issues a challenge other than the one she was expecting and for which she manufactured the result, then she will be unable to respond to the challenge under the assumption of infeasibility of solving the discrete log for this group. If she picked  and disclosed , then she will be unable to produce a valid  that would pass Victor's verification, given that she does not know .

Thus, a cheating prover has a 0.5 probability of successfully cheating in one round. By executing a large enough number of rounds, the probability of a cheating prover succeeding can be made arbitrarily low.

Short summary 

Peggy proves to know the value of x (for example her password).

Peggy and Victor agree on a prime  and a generator  of the multiplicative group of the field .
Peggy calculates the value  and transfers the value to Victor.
The following two steps are repeated a (large) number of times.
Peggy repeatedly picks a random value  and calculates . She transfers the value  to Victor.
Victor asks Peggy to calculate and transfer either the value  or the value . In the first case Victor verifies . In the second case he verifies .

Hamiltonian cycle for a large graph 
The following scheme is due to Manuel Blum.

In this scenario, Peggy knows a Hamiltonian cycle for a large graph . Victor knows  but not the cycle (e.g., Peggy has generated  and revealed it to him.) Finding a Hamiltonian cycle given a large graph is believed to be computationally infeasible, since its corresponding decision version is known to be NP-complete. Peggy will prove that she knows the cycle without simply revealing it (perhaps Victor is interested in buying it but wants verification first, or maybe Peggy is the only one who knows this information and is proving her identity to Victor).

To show that Peggy knows this Hamiltonian cycle, she and Victor play several rounds of a game.

She could do so by using a cryptographic commitment scheme. Then she puts all these pieces of paper face down on a table.
 Victor then randomly chooses one of two questions to ask Peggy.
Victor can verify that they are indeed isomorphic.
This is enough for Victor to check that  does indeed contain a Hamiltonian cycle.

This can be done by, for example, committing to every edge (or lack thereof) separately.

Completeness 

Zero-knowledge 
For example, if Peggy knew ahead of time that Victor would ask to see the Hamiltonian cycle in  then she could generate a Hamiltonian cycle for an unrelated graph. Similarly, if Peggy knew in advance that Victor would ask to see the isomorphism then she could simply generate an isomorphic graph  (in which she also does not know a Hamiltonian cycle). Victor could simulate the protocol by himself (without Peggy) because he knows what he will ask to see.

Soundness 
For all realistic purposes, it is infeasibly difficult to defeat a zero-knowledge proof with a reasonable number of rounds in this way.

Variants of zero-knowledge 
Different variants of zero-knowledge can be defined by formalizing the intuitive concept of what is meant by the output of the simulator "looking like" the execution of the real proof protocol in the following ways:

 We speak of perfect zero-knowledge if the distributions produced by the simulator and the proof protocol are distributed exactly the same. This is for instance the case in the first example above.
 Statistical zero-knowledge means that the distributions are not necessarily exactly the same, but they are statistically close, meaning that their statistical difference is a negligible function.
 We speak of computational zero-knowledge if no efficient algorithm can distinguish the two distributions.

Zero knowledge types
 Proof of knowledge: the knowledge is hidden in the exponent like in the example shown above.
 Witness indistinguishable proof: verifiers cannot know which witness is used for producing the proof.
 Multi-party computation: while each party can keep their respective secret, they together produce a result.
 Ring signature: outsiders have no idea which key is used for signing.

Applications

Authentication systems 
Research in zero-knowledge proofs has been motivated by authentication systems where one party wants to prove its identity to a second party via some secret information (such as a password) but doesn't want the second party to learn anything about this secret. This is called a "zero-knowledge proof of knowledge".  However, a password is typically too small or insufficiently random to be used in many schemes for zero-knowledge proofs of knowledge. A zero-knowledge password proof is a special kind of zero-knowledge proof of knowledge that addresses the limited size of passwords.

In April 2015, the Sigma protocol (one-out-of-many proofs) was introduced. In August 2021, Cloudflare, an American web infrastructure and security company decided to use the one-out-of-many proofs mechanism for private web verification using vendor hardware.

Ethical behavior 
One of the uses of zero-knowledge proofs within cryptographic protocols is to enforce honest behavior while maintaining privacy.  Roughly, the idea is to force a user to prove, using a zero-knowledge proof, that its behavior is correct according to the protocol. Because of soundness, we know that the user must really act honestly in order to be able to provide a valid proof.  Because of zero knowledge, we know that the user does not compromise the privacy of its secrets in the process of providing the proof.

Nuclear disarmament 
In 2016, the Princeton Plasma Physics Laboratory and Princeton University demonstrated a technique that may have applicability to future nuclear disarmament talks. It would allow inspectors to confirm whether or not an object is indeed a nuclear weapon without recording, sharing or revealing the internal workings which might be secret.

Blockchains 
Zero-knowledge proofs were applied in the Zerocoin and Zerocash protocols, which culminated in the birth of Zcoin (later rebranded as Firo in 2020) and Zcash cryptocurrencies in 2016. Zerocoin has a built-in mixing model that does not trust any peers or centralised mixing providers to ensure anonymity. Users can transact in a base currency and can cycle the currency into and out of Zerocoins. The Zerocash protocol uses a similar model (a variant known as a non-interactive zero-knowledge proof) except that it can obscure the transaction amount, while Zerocoin cannot. Given significant restrictions of transaction data on the Zerocash network, Zerocash is less prone to privacy timing attacks when compared to Zerocoin. However, this additional layer of privacy can cause potentially undetected hyperinflation of Zerocash supply because fraudulent coins cannot be tracked.

In 2018, Bulletproofs were introduced. Bulletproofs are an improvement from non-interactive zero-knowledge proof where trusted setup is not needed. It was later implemented into the Mimblewimble protocol (which the Grin and Beam cryptocurrencies are based upon) and Monero cryptocurrency. In 2019, Firo implemented the Sigma protocol, which is an improvement on the Zerocoin protocol without trusted setup. In the same year, Firo introduced the Lelantus protocol, an improvement on the Sigma protocol, where the former hides the origin and amount of a transaction.

History  
Zero-knowledge proofs were first conceived in 1985 by Shafi Goldwasser, Silvio Micali, and Charles Rackoff in their paper "The Knowledge Complexity of Interactive Proof-Systems". This paper introduced the IP hierarchy of interactive proof systems (see interactive proof system) and conceived the concept of knowledge complexity, a measurement of the amount of knowledge about the proof transferred from the prover to the verifier. They also gave the first zero-knowledge proof for a concrete problem, that of deciding quadratic nonresidues mod . Together with a paper by László Babai and Shlomo Moran, this landmark paper invented interactive proof systems, for which all five authors won the first Gödel Prize in 1993.

In their own words, Goldwasser, Micali, and Rackoff say:

Of particular interest is the case where this additional knowledge is essentially 0 and we show that [it] is possible to interactively prove that a number is quadratic non residue mod m releasing 0 additional knowledge. This is surprising as no efficient algorithm for deciding quadratic residuosity mod m is known when m’s factorization is not given. Moreover, all known NP proofs for this problem exhibit the prime factorization of m. This indicates that adding interaction to the proving process, may decrease the amount of knowledge that must be communicated in order to prove a theorem.

The quadratic nonresidue problem has both an NP and a co-NP algorithm, and so lies in the intersection of NP and co-NP. This was also true of several other problems for which zero-knowledge proofs were subsequently discovered, such as an unpublished proof system by Oded Goldreich verifying that a two-prime modulus is not a Blum integer.

Oded Goldreich, Silvio Micali, and Avi Wigderson took this one step further, showing that, assuming the existence of unbreakable encryption, one can create a zero-knowledge proof system for the NP-complete graph coloring problem with three colors. Since every problem in NP can be efficiently reduced to this problem, this means that, under this assumption, all problems in NP have zero-knowledge proofs. The reason for the assumption is that, as in the above example, their protocols require encryption. A commonly cited sufficient condition for the existence of unbreakable encryption is the existence of one-way functions, but it is conceivable that some physical means might also achieve it.

On top of this, they also showed that the graph nonisomorphism problem, the complement of the graph isomorphism problem, has a zero-knowledge proof. This problem is in co-NP, but is not currently known to be in either NP or any practical class. More generally, Russell Impagliazzo and Moti Yung as well as Ben-Or et al. would go on to show that, also assuming one-way functions or unbreakable encryption, that there are zero-knowledge proofs for all problems in IP = PSPACE, or in other words, anything that can be proved by an interactive proof system can be proved with zero knowledge.

Not liking to make unnecessary assumptions, many theorists sought a way to eliminate the necessity of one way functions. One way this was done was with multi-prover interactive proof systems (see interactive proof system), which have multiple independent provers instead of only one, allowing the verifier to "cross-examine" the provers in isolation to avoid being misled. It can be shown that, without any intractability assumptions, all languages in NP have zero-knowledge proofs in such a system.

It turns out that in an Internet-like setting, where multiple protocols may be executed concurrently, building zero-knowledge proofs is more challenging.  The line of research investigating concurrent zero-knowledge proofs was initiated by the work of Dwork, Naor, and Sahai. One particular development along these lines has been the development of witness-indistinguishable proof protocols. The property of witness-indistinguishability is related to that of zero-knowledge, yet witness-indistinguishable protocols do not suffer from the same problems of concurrent execution.

Another variant of zero-knowledge proofs are non-interactive zero-knowledge proofs. Blum, Feldman, and Micali showed that a common random string shared between the prover and the verifier is enough to achieve computational zero-knowledge without requiring interaction.

Zero-Knowledge Proof protocols 
The most popular interactive or non-interactive zero-knowledge proof (e.g., zk-SNARK) protocols can be broadly categorized in the following four categories: Succinct Non-Interactive ARguments of Knowledge (SNARK), Scalable Transparent ARgument of Knowledge (STARK), Verifiable Polynomial Delegation (VPD), and Succinct Non-interactive ARGuments (SNARG). A list of zero-knowledge proof protocols and libraries is provided below along with comparisons based on transparency, universality, plausible post-quantum security, and programming paradigm. A transparent protocol is one that does not require any trusted setup and uses public randomness. A universal protocol is one that does not require a separate trusted setup for each circuit. Finally, a plausibly post-quantum protocol is one that is not susceptible to known attacks involving quantum algorithms.

See also 

 Arrow information paradox
 Cryptographic protocol
 Feige–Fiat–Shamir identification scheme
 Proof of knowledge
 Topics in cryptography
 Witness-indistinguishable proof
 Zero-knowledge password proof
 Non-interactive zero-knowledge proof

References 

Theory of cryptography
Zero-knowledge protocols